Husayn Fakhri al-Khalidi (1895 – 6 February 1962) was mayor of Jerusalem from 1934 to 1937 and the 13th Prime Minister of Jordan in 1957.

On 23 June 1935 Khalidi founded the Reform Party and was subsequently the party's representative to the Arab Higher Committee.

On 1 October 1937, amid the 1936–39 Arab revolt in Palestine, the British Mandate administration outlawed the AHC and several Arab political parties and arrested a number of Arab political leaders. The Reform Party was dissolved and Khalidi was one of the leaders arrested. He was removed as mayor of Jerusalem and deported to the Seychelles, together with four other Arab nationalist political leaders. He was released in December 1938 to enable him to take part in the London Conference in February 1939, and was among those rejecting the British Government's White Paper of 1939.

Khalidi returned to Mandatory Palestine in 1943 and joined the reformed Arab Higher Committee in 1945, becoming its secretary in 1946. He was a member of the short-lived All-Palestine Government established under Egypt's patronage in Gaza in September 1948. He published a book of his memoirs in the same year, while exiled in Beirut. He prospered under Jordanian rule, he was custodian and supervisor of the Haram al-Sharif in 1951, became a cabinet minister (for Foreign Affairs) and briefly prime minister in 1957. In 1958, he wrote a book in English entitled Arab Exodus, though it has never been published.

Khalidi died on 6 February 1962. He was the brother of Ismail Khalidi and the uncle of Rashid Khalidi and Raja Khalidi.

See also
 List of prime ministers of Jordan

References

External links
 Prime Ministry of Jordan website

Khalidi family
1895 births
1966 deaths
Arab people in Mandatory Palestine
Mayors of Jerusalem
Palestinian refugees
Government ministers of Jordan
Prime Ministers of Jordan
Foreign ministers of Jordan
Social affairs ministers of Jordan
Health ministers of Jordan
Defence ministers of Jordan
American University of Beirut alumni
Members of the Senate of Jordan
Date of birth missing
Place of death missing
Members of the All-Palestine Government
20th-century Palestinian people